Linda Wright Hartgen ( Gardner) is an American politician from Idaho. She is a Republican member of Idaho House of Representatives for District 24, seat B.

Education 
In 1991, Hartgen earned a Bachelor of Science in business management from Lewis–Clark State College.

Career 
In 1991, Hartgen became a court clerk, until 1992. From 1992 to 2015, she was a trial court administrator at the Idaho Supreme Court.

On November 6, 2018, Hartgen won the election and became a Republican member of Idaho House of Representatives for District 24, seat B. Hartgen defeated Deborah Silver and Anthony Tomkins with 57.7% of the votes.

Hartgen has announced that she will be running for the seat of retiring state senator Lee Heider, from District 24.

Personal life 
Hartgen's husband was Stephen Hartgen who died on 31 December 2021. She has three children. Hartgen and her family live in Twin Falls, Idaho.

References

External links 
 Linda Wright Hartgen at ballotpedia.org
 Twin Falls to decide who will replace Steven Hartgen in Idaho legislature (November 4, 2018)
 Freshman Magic Valley legislators reflect on their first session (April 18, 2019)

Living people
Republican Party members of the Idaho House of Representatives
People from Twin Falls, Idaho
Women state legislators in Idaho
Year of birth missing (living people)
21st-century American politicians
21st-century American women politicians